Dennis Yaager (born in Leichhardt, New South Wales) is an Australian former association football player.

Playing career

Club career
During the 1964–65 season he spent time at Everton, though he did not make a first team appearance. He later had stints at Hakoah and Croatia in the New South Wales State League.

International career
Yaager made his full international debut for Australia in November 1970 against Iran in Tehran. He made his second and final appearance against Mexico in Mexico City in December 1970.

References 

Australian soccer players
Australia international soccer players
Living people
Association football midfielders
Year of birth missing (living people)